Kizichesky Vvedensky Monastery is a Russian Orthodox male monastery in Kazan, Tatarstan.

In the 1690s Vvedensky Cathedral (Presentation of Mary Cathedral) and Vladimirskaya Church (Church of Vladimir Icon of Virgin) were built. Vvedensky Cathedral was destroyed during the Soviet period.

Count  (the grandfather of Lev Tolstoy) is buried in the monastery.

Religious buildings and structures in Kazan
Russian Orthodox monasteries in Russia
Cultural heritage monuments in Tatarstan
1691 establishments in Russia
Religious organizations established in 1691